Alessandro Doveri (1771 - 10 November, 1845) was an Italian architect and engineer of the Neoclassical-style, active mainly in his native Siena.

Biography
He was initially sent to Pisa to study architecture. In 1810, he returned to Siena where he was employed as an engineer of roads and bridges. With the return of the Lorraine dynasty, he was employed between 1814 to 1817 in designing the new Teatro Rozzi in Piazza Indipendenza, Siena. He continued to work as an architect for the government of Siena until 1836, and was involved in numerous reconstruction and engineering efforts. He died in Siena.

References

1771 births
1845 deaths
People from Siena
19th-century Italian architects
Italian neoclassical architects